Oumar Koné is a Malian professional footballer, who plays as a defender for Stade Malien.

International career
In January 2014, coach Djibril Dramé, invited him to be a part of the Mali squad for the 2014 African Nations Championship. He helped the team to the quarter finals where they lost to Zimbabwe by two goals to one.

References

Living people
Mali international footballers
Malian footballers
2016 African Nations Championship players
2014 African Nations Championship players
1991 births
Association football defenders
21st-century Malian people
Mali A' international footballers
2011 African Nations Championship players
Stade Malien players